Patrick O'Connor (born 6 February 1991) is an Irish sportsperson. He plays hurling with his local club Tubber and was a member of the Clare senior inter-county team from 2011 until he retired form inter-county hurling in 2022.
He made his Championship debut for Clare against Tipperary in the 2011 Munster Senior Hurling Championship on 19 July 2011.

Honours

Gort Community School
Connacht Colleges Senior Hurling Championship: 2007, 2008, 2009 (c)

Clare
 All-Ireland Senior Hurling Championship: 2013
 National Hurling League: 2016
 All-Ireland Under-21 Hurling Championship: 2009, 2012
 Munster Under-21 Hurling Championship: 2009, 2012

References

Living people
Clare inter-county hurlers
1991 births
Tubber hurlers